Pawnee Killer (born 1826) was a leader of the Oglala. He also led a band of mixed Sioux-Cheyenne Dog Soldiers during the US war against the Plains Indians.

His name was derived from his exploits against the Pawnee, the traditional enemies of the Oglala and allies of the US government.

He participated in the attack on Julesburg in Colorado and the Fetterman Fight in Wyoming during Red Cloud's War. He also fought in the so-called Kidder fight in Kansas in 1867 and possibly the Battle of Beecher Island in 1868.

After the end of the American-Sioux wars, he settled with his family at the Pine Ridge Reservation of the Red Cloud Agency in Nebraska. Little is known of his later life although he is listed on the reservation's census records, as a head of household, until June 1895.

References

Oglala people
1826 births
Year of death missing
19th-century Native Americans
Native American people of the Indian Wars
Cheyenne people
Lakota leaders
People from the Pine Ridge Indian Reservation, South Dakota